Neanuroidea is a superfamily of springtails in the order Poduromorpha. There are at least 3 families and more than 730 described species in Neanuroidea.

Families
These three families belong to the superfamily Neanuroidea:
 Brachystomellidae
 Neanuridae
 Odontellidae

References

Further reading

External links

 

Poduromorpha
Arthropod superfamilies